Clay Johnson may refer to:

 Clay Johnson (basketball) (born 1956), retired American professional basketball player
 Clay Johnson (technologist) (born 1977), American technologist
 Clay Johnson III, White House official
 Clay Johnson(Clay Johnson), Clay Johnson